The Sea Hound is a 1947 Columbia 15-chapter movie serial starring Buster Crabbe based on the radio show The Sea Hound.  It was the 34th of the 57 serials produced by Columbia Pictures. Buster Crabbe starred as Capt. Silver, master of the Sea Hound, and Ralph Hodges played his faithful sidekick Jerry. Pamela Blake played the captain's love interest, Ann Whitney.

Synopsis
Captain Silver and his crew receive a distress call in the South Pacific.  They rescue the crew of a yacht from modern pirates and get caught up in a search for lost treasure.

Cast
 Buster Crabbe as Captain Silver
 Jimmy Lloyd as Tex
 Pamela Blake as Ann Whitney
 Ralph Hodges as Jerry
 Spencer Chan as "Cookie" Kukai
 Robert Barron as The Admiral
 Hugh Prosser as Stanley Rand
 Rick Vallin as Manila Pete
 Jack Ingram as Murdock

Chapter titles
 Captain Silver Sails Again
 Spanish Gold
 The Mystery of the Map
 Menaced by Ryaks
 Captain Silver's Strategy
 The Sea Hound at Bay
 Rand's Treachery
 In the Admiral's Lair
 On the Water Wheel
 On the Treasure Trail
 The Sea Hound Attacked
 Dangerous Waters
 The Panther's Prey
 The Fatal Double-cross
 Captain Silver's Last Stand
Source:

References

External links

1947 films
1947 adventure films
American adventure films
American black-and-white films
1940s English-language films
Pirate films
Seafaring films
Columbia Pictures film serials
Films based on radio series
Films directed by Mack V. Wright
Films scored by Paul Sawtell
Films with screenplays by George H. Plympton
1940s American films